Alexandra Fusai and Nathalie Tauziat were the defending champions, but Tauziat did not compete this year. Fusai teamed up with Rita Grande and lost in the first round to Anne Kremer and Virginie Razzano.

Elena Bovina and Daniela Hantuchová won the title by defeating Bianka Lamade and Patty Schnyder 6–3, 6–3 in the final.

Seeds

Draw

Draw

References

External links
 Official results archive (ITF)
 Official results archive (WTA)

2001 Doubles
SEAT Open - Doubles
2001 in Luxembourgian tennis